This is a list of Australian television-related events in 1975.

Events 
 28 February – Television in Australia switches to full-time colour, marking the last day of Australian television in black and white. Colour transmission would launch officially on 1 March on Saturday at 12:00am. Seven Network, The 0-10 Network and ABC stayed on air all night for the occasion.
 28 February – The ABC airs a spin-off television special of The Aunty Jack Show, called Aunty Jack Introduces Colour. It promotes the introduction of Australian television in colour.
 1 March – "C-Day" in Australia; full-time colour broadcasting takes effect (except in Darwin).
 1 March – Australian music program Countdown arrives  on to the scene with a bang by becoming the first program on ABC to be broadcast in colour with Johnny Farnham as the host. That episode was the show's real first episode, besides with the previous series lost.
 1 March – British children's stop motion animated series The Wombles created by Elisabeth Beresford and narrated by Bernard Cribbins premieres on ABC.
 21 March – The ABC broadcasts a collection of four comedy specials derived from The Aunty Jack Show titled Wollongong the Brave starting off with "Norman Gunston – The Golden Weeks".
 12 May – American talk show host and singer Don Lane presents his very own talk show The Don Lane Show with Bert Newton as co host.
 5 September – The 839th episode (also known as the infamous 'bomb-blast' episode) of the popular Australian soap opera Number 96, which wiped out four regular characters in a bid to reinstate the series' former top rating position, is shown on The 0-10 Network.
 13 October – Australian news magazine program 11AM hosted by Roger Climpson debuts on Seven Network.
 27 October - NTD returns to the air in Darwin, for the first time since Cyclone Tracy.
 13 December – The Federal Election — barely a month after the controversial dismissal of the Whitlam Government — gets coverage across all networks.
 TEN10 Sydney launches its first one-hour news service Eyewitness News.
 Graham Kennedy has been banned from making appearances on live television after his infamous "crow call" on The Graham Kennedy Show on Nine Network.

Debuts

New International Programming 
 30 January –  The Manhunter (Nine Network)
 6 February –  Little House on the Prairie (Nine Network)
 10 February –  The Rockford Files (Channel 0)
 13 February –  No, Honestly (Seven Network)
 16 February –  Some Mothers Do 'Ave 'Em (ABC)
 17 February –  Police Woman (Seven Network)
 1 March –  The Wombles (1973) (ABC)
 3 March –  Casanova '73 (ABC)
 14 March –  Hong Kong Phooey (Nine Network)
 6 May –  Carrie's War (ABC)
 31 May –  Valley of the Dinosaurs (Nine Network)
 7 June –  Shazam! (Channel 0)
 21 June –  Movin' On (Channel 0)
 14 July –  Dinah! (Nine Network)
 30 August –  Petrocelli (Nine Network)
 7 September –  It Ain't Half Hot Mum (ABC)
 5 October –  Moody and Pegg (ABC)
 8 October –  The New Adventures of Gilligan (Channel 0)
 20 October –  Bod (ABC)
 3 November –  Nakia (Nine Network)
 3 November –  Sigmund and the Sea Monsters (Nine Network)
 4 November –  Crystal Tipps and Alistair (ABC)
 15 November –  Paper Moon (Nine Network)

Television shows

1950s 
 Mr. Squiggle and Friends (1959–1999).

1960s 
 Four Corners (1961–present).
 It's Academic (1968–1978)
 Division 4 (1969–1975)

1970s 
 Hey Hey It's Saturday (1971–1999, 2009–2010).
 Young Talent Time (1971–1988)
 Countdown (1974–1987).
 The Don Lane Show (1975–1983).

Ending this year

See also 
 1975 in Australia
 List of Australian films of 1975

References